German submarine U-127 was a Type IXC U-boat of Nazi Germany's Kriegsmarine during World War II. She was laid down at the DeSchiMAG AG Weser yard in Bremen as yard number 990 on 20 June 1940, launched on 1 February 1941 and commissioned on 24 April under the command of Korvettenkapitän Bruno Hansmann.

Design
German Type IXC submarines were slightly larger than the original Type IXBs. U-127 had a displacement of  when at the surface and  while submerged. She had two shafts and two  propellers.

U-127 was fitted with six  torpedo tubes (four fitted at the bow and two at the stern), 22 torpedoes, one  SK C/32 naval gun, 180 rounds, and a  SK C/30 as well as a  C/30 anti-aircraft gun. The boat had a complement of forty-eight.

Service history
She began her brief service career training with the 2nd U-boat Flotilla and was declared operational with the same organization on 1 November 1941.

Patrol and loss
U-127 departed Kiel on 29 November, crossed the North Sea and entered the Atlantic Ocean via the 'gap' between the Faroe and Shetland Islands.

She was sunk west of Gibraltar on 15 December by the Australian destroyer . Out of a crew of 51, there were no survivors.

Wolfpacks
U-127 took part in one wolfpack, namely:
 Seeräuber (14 – 15 December 1941)

References

Bibliography

External links

World War II submarines of Germany
World War II shipwrecks in the Atlantic Ocean
1941 ships
Ships built in Bremen (state)
German Type IX submarines
U-boats commissioned in 1941
U-boats sunk in 1941
U-boats sunk by depth charges
U-boats sunk by Australian warships
Ships lost with all hands
Maritime incidents in December 1941